
Gmina Dębowa Łąka is a rural gmina (administrative district) in Wąbrzeźno County, Kuyavian-Pomeranian Voivodeship, in north-central Poland.

Villages
Gmina Dębowa Łąka contains the villages and settlements of Dębowa Łąka, Kurkocin, Lipnica, Łobdowo, Małe Pułkowo, Niedźwiedź, Wielkie Pułkowo and Wielkie Radowiska.

Neighbouring gminas
Gmina Dębowa Łąka is bordered by the gminas of Bobrowo, Golub-Dobrzyń, Kowalewo Pomorskie, Książki and Wąbrzeźno.

References
Polish official population figures 2006

Debowa Laka
Wąbrzeźno County